Henrik Kjelsrud Johansen (born 22 March 1993) is a Norwegian footballer who plays as a forward for Brann. He previously played for the Tippeligaen clubs Lillestrøm, Haugesund, Odd and Vålerenga.

Club career
Hailing from Gjøvik, Johansen played for Gjøvik FF before he joined Raufoss IL ahead of the 2011 season. He was loaned out to Lillestrøm in August 2011, and Johansen played four matches for the club in Tippeligaen but Lillestrøm did not use their option to sign him permanently.

Johansen returned to Raufoss ahead of the 2012 season, and scored 14 goals in 16 matches for the team in the Second Division before he was sold to FK Haugesund in August 2012. Johansen made his debut for Haugesund in the 0–1 loss against Odd in September 2012. He scored his first goal in Tippeligaen in the match against Sandnes Ulf on 23 September 2012. Johansen scored four goals for Haugesund in the 2013 Norwegian Football Cup and played 14 matches in the 2013 Tippeligaen without scoring a goal, when Haugesund won bronze in Tippeligaen.

Ahead of the 2014 season, Johansen transferred to Odd, and their head coach Dag-Eilev Fagermo stated that he had been watching Johansen since Odd met Raufoss in the 2012 Norwegian Football Cup.

In February 2018, Johansen signed for SK Brann for a reported fee around €50 000.

International career
Johansen first represented Norway when he played for the under-18 team in 2011. He has later represented Norway at under-19 and under-21 level.

Career statistics

References

1993 births
Living people
Norwegian footballers
Sportspeople from Gjøvik
Norway under-21 international footballers
Norway youth international footballers
Raufoss IL players
Lillestrøm SK players
FK Haugesund players
Odds BK players
Fredrikstad FK players
Vålerenga Fotball players
SK Brann players
Eliteserien players
Norwegian First Division players
Norwegian Second Division players

Association football forwards